Sta. Niña  (Saint Niña)  is a 2012 Filipino drama film directed by Emmanuel Quindo Palo. The film is Palo's first directorial venture. The film tells the story of Paulino who unexpectedly unearths the remains of his 2-year-old daughter in a lahar-filled quarry. It was  one of the official entries for the New Breed Full Length Feature Category in Cinemalaya 2012.

Synopsis
Years after volcanic mud flow covered a town in Pampanga, Pol and his co workers dig up the coffin of his daughter. The remains of two-year-old Marikit did not show any signs of decay. Many consider this a miracle and people troop to Pol's home to be healed by Marikit. As people are getting healed purportedly by the dead child, Pol insists that his child is worthy of being called a saint. Thus begins his crusade to get his daughter beatified. Unearthing her body digs up unresolved issues in many persons' lives. In the end, an event will make us ask if there was healing, a cleansing of sins and a chance to move on.

Cast
 Coco Martin as Paulino 'Pol' Mungcal
 Alessandra de Rossi as Madeleine 'Madel' Mabanglo Mungcal
 Anita Linda as Benigna 'Bining' Mungcal
 Angel Aquino as Sister Josefa
 Irma Adlawan as Cora Mabanglo
 Nanding Josef as Fr. Mallari
 Joe Gruta as Gov. Servando Magat
 Lui Manansala as Mrs. Carmen Magat
 Leo Martinez as Obispo
 Rie Batingana as Melchor/Zora
 Bea Garcia as Gia Pangan
 Patricia Ismael	as Malou
 Rhian Venice Gomez as Daughter of Pol
 Dax Alejandro as Abel
 Allan Guanlao as Ben
 Rhian Venice Gomez as Daughter of Paulino
 Jobert Luzares as Sonny
 Adrian Sebastian as Joel
 Kristine Pearl Lagman as Gemma
 Mary Joyce Lopez as Joy

Awards
36th Gawad Urian Awards
Pinakamahusay na Pangalawang Aktres: Alessandra de Rossi
2013 Golden Screen Awards
Best Actress in a Supporting Role: Anita Linda
2013 1st ASEAN International Film Festival and Awards 
Best Picture for Drama 
Best Director: Emmanuel Quindo Palo
Best Actress: Alessandra de Rossi
Best Supporting Actress: Anita Linda
2012 17th International Film Festival of Kerala
The Golden Crow Pheasant Award for Best Feature Film aka Suvarna Chakoram
2012 Cinemalaya Philippine Independent Film Festival
Best Supporting Actress: Anita Linda

References

External links
 

Philippine drama films
2012 films
Star Cinema films
Films directed by Emmanuel Quindo Palo